Innocenzo Del Bufalo-Cancellieri (1566–1610) was a Roman Catholic cardinal.

Biography
On 20 May 1601, he was consecrated bishop by Mariano Pierbenedetti, Cardinal-Priest of Santi Marcellino e Pietro, with Napoleone Comitoli, Bishop of Perugia, and Tommaso Vannini, Bishop of Avellino e Frigento, serving as co-consecrators.

While bishop, he was the principal consecrator of Virgilio Fiorenzi, Bishop of Nocera Umbra (1605).

References

1566 births
1610 deaths
17th-century Italian cardinals
Apostolic Nuncios to France
Inquisitors of Malta